John Cargill Thompson (1938 - 2000) was a Scottish dramatist specialising in one-person plays. After the performance of his 52nd play, he was described as "Britain's most prolific playwright", surpassing Shakespeare's 37 and Alan Ayckbourn's 51.

Biography
He was born in Burma on 1 November 1938, but brought up in Glasgow. He was educated at Glasgow High School and the Royal Scottish Academy of Music and Drama. He taught in the Drama Department of University College of North Wales, Bangor, and was senior lecturer in acting at the School of Theatre, Manchester Polytechnic, before giving up teaching to write full-time.

Many of his plays were based on the 18th-century dramatists and actors about whom he had taught. He had several successes at the Edinburgh Festival Fringe, notably a double Fringe First Award in 1992 for Shylock Triumphant, about Charles Macklin and Every Inch a King about David Garrick. His record-breaking 52nd play was Soul Doubt, staged at the New End Theatre, Hampstead, London in 1997.

He collected the works of G. A. Henty and wrote The Boys' Dumas, G. A. Henty: Aspects of Victorian Publishing (1975).

A profile in February 1997 described his central London flat as " ... a haven of eccentricity. The kitchen is a Bohemian nightmare where dirty dishes, bottles of whisky and gin, and tubes of toothpaste vie for space." and said that he was then working on a play "which has the goddess Juno being interviewed by Hello! magazine." He was  married twice, first to Sheila, with whom he had daughters, Perdita and Lilith and then to  Dorothea, with whom he had daughters Jessica and Nerissa.  He died in Edinburgh on 19 September 2000, aged 61.

His sister was Helen Cargill Thompson, a librarian and art collector.

Selected works

Plays
Macbeth Speaks, based on Macbeth, King of Scotland
The Actor's Apology, based on an incident when George Frederick Cooke was required to apologise to an audience for his drunkenness
Shylock Triumphant, about Charles Macklin
Every Inch a King, about David Garrick
When the Rain Stops, the tale of Mrs Noah
 ... and many more

Books
The boys' Dumas, G. A. Henty: aspects of Victorian publishing (Carcanet, 1975)
An introduction to fifty British plays, 1660-1900 (Pan Books, 1979) (also published by Heinemann as A reader's guide to fifty British plays, 1660-1900, 1980)

References

1938 births
2000 deaths
Scottish dramatists and playwrights
20th-century British dramatists and playwrights